The Khamseh is a tribal confederation in the province of Fars in southwestern Iran. It consists of five tribes, hence its name Khamseh, "the five". The tribes are partly nomadic, Some are Persian speaking Basseri, some are Arabic speaking Arabs, and some are Qashqai Language speaking (Inalu, Baharlu and Nafar). They are sheep breeders, which they herd mounted on camels.

The history of the Khamseh confederation of tribes starts in 1861–1862 when Naser al-Din Shah Qajar created the Khamseh Tribal Confederation. He combined five existing nomadic tribes, the Arab, Nafar, Baharlu, Inalu, and the Basseri and placed them under the control of the Qavam ol-Molk family. The pattern of forcibly uniting tribes was not a new idea, as the Safavid Shahs previously created homogenous Qizilbash confederations to temper the increasing strength of the Qashqai, who were gaining so much power.
The Khamseh tribes were a mixture of Persians, Turks, and Arabs.

Tribes
The Basseri (Persian)
The Inalu (Qashqai - Turkic)
The Baharlu (Qashqai - Turkic)
The Nafar (Qashqai - Turkic)
The Arab (Arabic)

See also
Demographics of Iran
Ethnic minorities in Iran

References

Further reading
 Nomads Of South Persia (1961) by Fredrik Barth about the Basseri Tribe (read book)
 Nomads Of Persia (2014) by Ehsan Yousefi about the Basseri Tribe
 Ali Mohammad Najafi. Khamseh Tribes happenings

Persian tribes
Ethnic groups in Iran
Fars Province
Iranian Arab people by location
1861 establishments in Iran
Turkic peoples of Asia